Olos or OLOS may refer to:

Olos, an album by the Finnish rock group Absoluuttinen Nollapiste.
Mihai Olos,  Romanian conceptual artist, poet
Krzysztof Oloś, Polish keyboardist for the symphonic black metal band Vesania
OLOS (obstructed-line-of-sight) see Non-line-of-sight propagation